In the Whyte notation for the classification of steam locomotives by wheel arrangement, a 2-8-8-0 is a locomotive with a two-wheel leading truck, two sets of eight driving wheels, and no trailing truck. These were nicknamed "Bull Mooses".

Equivalent classifications
Other equivalent classifications are:
UIC classification: 1DD (also known as German classification and Italian classification)
French classification: 140+040
Turkish classification: 45+44
Swiss classification: 4/5+4/4

The UIC classification is refined to (1'D)D for Mallet locomotives.

Examples
The Great Northern Railway used the 2-8-8-0s as their N-1's which were built by Baldwin in 1912. They were rebuilt by GN in 1932 as a N-2, and later re-rebuilt in 1940 as an N-3, The locomotives, after their third rebuild into a N-3, had a larger boiler and bigger tender. The N-3's served on the GN for a collective 45 years (including previous service lives as N-1 and N-2 classes), in use until retired in 1957. The Union Pacific Railroad also operated this type; it was called the "Bull Moose" by Union Pacific crews. The Union Pacific Bull Moose 2-8-8-0s were built in 1918 and 1924 by ALCO-Brooks. The Bull Moose Locomotives were used to haul heavy loads over Sherman Hill on the UP, the locomotives were most likely retired in the late 1940s to early 1950s because of slow speeds on freight, hauling at 12 miles an hour. The 9000 class of the Union Pacific can pull the same weight at 50 miles an hour. None of the Union Pacific Bull Moose Locomotives survived into preservation. An example of one is Union Pacific #3559, was built July 1924 by ALCO-Brooks and retired in October 1953. It was possibly scrapped in 1954. Out east, the Reading Railroad had 2-8-8-0s for coal switching on Steep Hills, also known as the Reading N-1, and the Baltimore and Ohio operated this type, with the B&O owning dozens of examples, most notably the EL-3 class. They were retired by the early 1950s.  In the Midwest, the Kansas City Southern was a principal user of this configuration.

The Atchison, Topeka and Santa Fe Railway was the first to use the configuration. In 1911, their own workshop took a pair of standard 2-8-0 and combined them into a 2-8-8-0 "Consolidation Mallet" articulated locomotive. Four examples were built, but were never entirely satisfactory and were converted back to 2-8-0 in 1923. The first 2-8-8-0 operated by Baltimore and Ohio was numbered EL-1/a, which was built in 1916 at Baldwin Locomotive Works. The western end of their network had ruling gradients greater than 2%, and the 2-8-8-0 offered exceptional tractive effort, enabling a single locomotive to move the heaviest freight trains. As well as building these locomotives from scratch, the last in 1920, ten were converted from 0-8-8-0 configuration in 1920 and a further ten from 2-8-8-2 in 1922. These locomotives remained in operation until after World War II, the last being withdrawn in 1955. None have been preserved.

One tender from the 2-8-8-0 #759 of the Kansas City Southern Railroad has been preserved, while the locomotive was scrapped. It is now preserved at the Illinois Railway Museum.

References

88,2-8-8-0